Thomas James Simpson (6 April 1933 – 29 February 2016) was an  Australian rules football player who played in the VFL between 1956 and 1963 for the Richmond Football Club.

References 

 Hogan P: The Tigers Of Old, Richmond FC, Melbourne 1996

1933 births
Richmond Football Club players
East Ballarat Football Club players
Australian rules footballers from Victoria (Australia)
2016 deaths